The list of ship commissionings in 1973 includes a chronological list of all ships commissioned in 1973.


See also 

1973
 Ship commissionings